The 1838 Rhode Island gubernatorial election was held on April 18, 1838.

Incumbent Democratic Governor John Brown Francis ran for election to a sixth term but was defeated by Whig nominee William Sprague.

General election

Candidates
John Brown Francis, Democratic, incumbent Governor
William Sprague, Whig, former U.S. Representative

Results

References

1838
Rhode Island
Gubernatorial